Chaosphere is the third studio album by Swedish extreme metal band Meshuggah. It was released on 9 November 1998 by Nuclear Blast, and is the only studio album to feature bassist Gustaf Hielm. Chaosphere'''s sound shows the band toning down some of the thrash style of their previous releases in favor of the technical, polyrhythmic, groove-oriented sound they would continue to explore on subsequent albums. A video was made for "New Millennium Cyanide Christ".

The Japanese version of the album contains a bonus song, titled "Unanything", as track 9. This song was also included on the promotional card-sleeve CD as track 6.
On both this and the standard album release, after "Elastic" there is a period of silence then an unlisted and unindexed track where four of the album's songs are played at once, with volume changes making each song somewhat dominant and recognisable in the mix at different times.

The "Reloaded" re-release features five of the six tracks from The True Human Design'' EP.

Track listing

Personnel

Meshuggah
 Jens Kidman – vocals
 Fredrik Thordendal – lead guitar, keyboards
 Mårten Hagström – rhythm guitar
 Gustaf Hielm – bass
 Tomas Haake – drums, vocals (on "Sane" and "The Exquisite Machinery of Torture")

Production
 Daniel Bergstrand – recording, mixdown
 Fredrik Thordendal – recording, mixdown
 Peter in de Betou – mastering (at Cutting Room, Stockholm, Sweden)
 Tomas Haake – artwork, design
 Meshuggah – art direction
 John Norhager – band photo

References

Meshuggah albums
1998 albums
Nuclear Blast albums